Ceratia is a genus of sea snails, marine gastropod mollusks the family Iravadiidae.

Species
Species within the genus Ceratia include:
 † Ceratia dissoluta Weichmann, 1874
 † Ceratia dufresnoyi (Des Moulins, 1868) - synonym: Ceratia suturalis Cossmann & Peyrot, 1919
 Ceratia francisca Lima, Júnior, Guimarães & Dominguez, 2016
 † Ceratia meridionalis Lozouet, 2015
 Ceratia nagashima Fukuda, 2000
 Ceratia pachia (Watson, 1886)
 † Ceratia pliocenica Ceregato & Tabanelli, 2005
 Ceratia proxima (Forbes & Hanley, 1850) - type species of the genus Ceratia, synonym: Ceratia altimirai Nordsieck, 1982
 Ceratia sergipana Lima, Júnior, Guimarães & Dominguez, 2016
 † Ceratia sternbergensis R. Janssen, 1978

Synonyms
 Ceratia watsoni Hornung & Mermod, 1927 is a synonym of Monotygma watsoni (Hornung & Mermod, 1927)

References

Iravadiidae